Barron Creek is a  northward-flowing stream originating in the lower foothills of the Santa Cruz Mountains in Los Altos Hills in Santa Clara County, California, United States. It courses northerly through the cities of Los Altos Hills and Palo Alto, before joining Adobe Creek just south of U.S. Highway 101. As Adobe Creek, its waters continue northwards to southwest San Francisco Bay after crossing under Highway 101 and traversing the Palo Alto Flood Basin.

History

In 1844 Rancho La Purisima Concepcion was sold to Juana Briones de Miranda, whose family members had accompanied both the Gaspar de Portolà and the Juan Bautista de Anza Expeditions. Her uniquely constructed wood-framed, rammed-earth and adobe brick house, believed to have been built by American deserter sailors, is located at 4155 Old Adobe Road on the border between Palo Alto and Los Altos Hills, and is marked by a historical marker at the corner of Old Adobe Road and Old Trace Lane. Designated a California State Historical Landmark in 1954, the 160-year-old Juana Briones home was scheduled for demolition in 2007 because of damage to it by the Loma Prieta earthquake in 1989. In 2009, it still stands and has been recently documented with a Historic American Buildings Survey (HABS).

After 1831, Mexican rancho owners would logically erect their dwellings on or very near creeks. Locally, Juanita Briones's adobe was near Barron Creek.

In 1853, Elisha Crosby bought a 250-acre parcel of Rancho Santa Rita, really Rancho Rincon de San Francisquito, from the Robles family in 1853 and named it Mayfield Farm. This would later become Barron Park after Edward Barron.

Watershed and course
It is the most modified creek in the Lower Peninsula Watershed, with 67% of its course classified as "hardened", meaning that most (but not all) of its course north of Foothill Expressway is in a concrete channel to its confluence with Adobe Creek. When there are heavy storm flows, the Barron Creek Diversion Channel, originating just north of Foothill Expressway, is used to divert heavy storm flows from the creek to Matadero Creek.

Barron Creek, alternatively known as Dry Creek, was tributary to Matadero Creek on the 1862 Allardt Map and the 1899 Topo Map. In the 1940s, it was diverted along its own channel across Palo Alto, eventually joining Adobe Creek near the Bayshore Highway. After crossing Foothill Expressway it is buried in an underground pipe just west of Gunn High School but sees daylight where the creek crosses Bol Park Bike Path in a small, man-made flood control basin, then at Laguna Avenue again enters an underground pipe running beneath Los Robles Avenue to El  Camino Real. Barron Creek has been greatly modified for flood control purposes; the creek bed downstream from El Camino Real is a concrete trapezoidal channel.

In the 1800s, the Baylands marshes ended just north of Alma in Palo Alto, which explains why historical maps show area creeks appearing to terminate before they reach the Bay. Duck-hunting blinds were common in the nineteenth century along what is now Middlefield Road.

Habitat and wildlife
No native fishes have been reported in the creek, save in its tidal reaches. Leidy reported no fish in a 1981 sampling, although both Adobe Creek and Matadero Creek are historic Steelhead trout (Oncorhynchus mykiss) streams.

Trails and recreation
Barron Creek is best seen at the Flood and Sedimentation Basin between Gunn High School and the Regional Bikepath, which crosses the creek on a bridge across the middle of the basin.

Watercourse gallery

See also
 List of watercourses in the San Francisco Bay Area

References

External links
 
 
 
 
 

Rivers of Santa Clara County, California
Santa Cruz Mountains
Rivers of Northern California
Tributaries of Adobe Creek (Santa Clara County)
Los Altos, California